Zebina sloaniana is a species of sea snail, a marine gastropod mollusk or micromollusk in the family Zebinidae.

Distribution
This species occurs in the Caribbean Sea, the Gulf of Mexico and the Lesser Antilles; in the Atlantic Ocean off North Carolina.

Description 
The maximum recorded shell length is 5 mm.

Habitat 
Minimum recorded depth is 0 m. Maximum recorded depth is 23 m.

References

 Rosenberg, G., F. Moretzsohn, and E. F. García. 2009. Gastropoda (Mollusca) of the Gulf of Mexico, Pp. 579–699 in Felder, D.L. and D.K. Camp (eds.), Gulf of Mexico–Origins, Waters, and Biota. Biodiversity. Texas A&M Press, College Station, Texas.

External links
 Orbigny A. d' (1841-1842). Mollusques. Vol 1: 1-264, pls 1-28 [pp. 1-208, 1841; pp. 209-264, 1842; dates of publication of plates (in vol. 8, Zoology Atlas) uncertain, possibly 1842]. In: Sagra, R. de la (ed.). Histoire physique, politique et naturelle de l'Ile de Cuba. Arthus Bertrand, Paris

sloaniana
Gastropods described in 1842